Kimiko Date-Krumm and Zhang Shuai were the defending champions but Zhang decided not to participate.
Date-Krumm played alongside Heather Watson and they reached the final but lost to the American pair Raquel Kops-Jones and Abigail Spears with the score of 1–6, 4–6.

Seeds

Draw

Draw

References
 Main Draw

HP Open - Doubles
2012 HP Open